Darevskia nairensis, the Armenia lizard, is a species of lizard in the family Lacertidae. The species is native to Armenia.

References

Darevskia
Reptiles described in 1967
Taxa named by Ilya Darevsky